This is a list of German plays:

A 
  (1807), by Heinrich von Kleist
 Der aufhaltsame Aufstieg des Arturo Ui (1941) by Bertolt Brecht
 Aufstieg und Fall der Stadt Mahagonny (1927–1930), by Bertolt Brecht

B 
 Baal (1918/1923), by Bertolt Brecht
 Die Hermannsschlacht (1808), by Heinrich von Kleist
 Der Biberpelz (1893), by Gerhart Hauptmann
 Der Bogen des Odysseus (1914), by Gerhart Hauptmann
 The Burghers of Calais (Die Bürger von Calais, 1913) by Georg Kaiser

C 
 Der kaukasische Kreidekreis (1943–45/1948), by Bertolt Brecht
  (1892), by Gerhart Hauptmann

D 
 Don Karlos, Infant von Spanien (1787), by Friedrich Schiller
 Don Juan (1952/1954), by Bertolt Brecht

E 
 Egmont (1787), by Johann Wolfgang von Goethe
 Elga (1896), by Gerhart Hauptmann
 Emilia Galotti (1772), by Gotthold Ephraim Lessing
 Erwin und Elmire (1775), by Johann Wolfgang von Goethe

F 
 , 1803), by Heinrich von Kleist
 Faust (1808), by Johann Wolfgang von Goethe
 Fiorenza (1907), by Thomas Mann
 Florian Geyer (1896), by Gerhart Hauptmann
 Frühlings Erwachen (1891), by Frank Wedekind
 Furcht und Elend des Dritten Reiches (1935–38/1938), by Bertolt Brecht
 Fuhrmann Henschel (1898), by Gerhart Hauptmann

G 
 Gabriel Schilling's Flight (Gabriel Schillings Flucht, (1912), by Gerhart Hauptmann
 Die Gewehre der Frau Carrar (1937/1937), by Bertolt Brecht
 Götz von Berlichingen (1773), by Johann Wolfgang von Goethe
 Griselda (1909), by Gerhart Hauptmann
 Die goldene Harfe (1933), by Gerhart Hauptmann

H 
 Hasemanns Töchter (1877), by Adolphe L'Arronge
 Haus Lonei (1880), by Adolphe L'Arronge
 Helios (1896) fragment, by Gerhart Hauptmann
 Herbert Engelmann (1921–26), by Gerhart Hauptmann
 Die Räuber, 1781), by Friedrich Schiller

I 
 Iphigenie auf Tauris (1779), by Johann Wolfgang von Goethe
 Iphigenie in Delphi (1941), by Gerhart Hauptmann
 Im Dickicht der Städte (1921–24/1923), by Bertolt Brecht
 Hanneles Himmelfahrt (1893), by Gerhart Hauptmann

J 
 Die Jungfrau von Orleans (1801), by Friedrich Schiller

K 
 Kabale und Liebe (1784), by Friedrich Schiller
 Das Käthchen von Heilbronn (1807–1808), by Heinrich von Kleist

L 
 Die Laune des Verliebten (1779), by Johann Wolfgang von Goethe
 Leben des Galilei (1937–39/1943), by Bertolt Brecht
 Leonce und Lena (1836), by Georg Büchner

M 
 Maria Stuart (1800), by Friedrich Schiller
 Mein Leopold (1873), by Adolphe L'Arronge
 Minna von Barnhelm' (1767), by Gotthold Ephraim Lessing
 Miß Sara Sampson (1755), by Gotthold Ephraim Lessing
 Von morgens bis mitternachts (1912), by Georg Kaiser
 Mutter Courage und ihre Kinder (1938–39/1941), by Bertolt Brecht

N 
 Nathan der Weise (1779), by Gotthold Ephraim Lessing
 Die natürliche Tochter (1803), by Johann Wolfgang von Goethe
 Die Nibelungen, by Christian Friedrich Hebbel

P 
 Penthesilea (1808), by Heinrich von Kleist
 Peter Brauer (1912), by Gerhart Hauptmann
 Prinz Friedrich von Homburg (1809–10), by Heinrich von Kleist
 Der Protagonist (1920), by Georg Kaiser

R 
 Die Ratten (1911), by Gerhart Hauptmann
 Robert Guiskard (1802), by Heinrich von Kleist
 Rose Bernd (1903), by Gerhart Hauptmann
 Der rote Hahn (1901), by Gerhart Hauptmann

S 
 Die Sieben Todsünden der Kleinbürger (1933), by Bertolt Brecht

U 
 Und Pippa Tanzt! (1906), by Gerhart Hauptmann

T 
 Trommeln in der Nacht (1918–20/1922), by Bertolt Brecht
 Torquato Tasso (1790), by Johann Wolfgang von Goethe
 Turandot, Prinzessin von China (1801), by Friedrich Schiller

V 
 Veland (1925), by Gerhart Hauptmann
 Die versunkene Glocke (1896), by Gerhart Hauptmann
 Die Verschwörung des Fiesco zu Genua (1783), by Friedrich Schiller
 Vor Sonnenaufgang (1887–89), by Gerhart Hauptmann

W 
 Wallenstein (1800), by Friedrich Schiller
 Die Weber (1892), by Gerhart Hauptmann
 Wilhelm Tell (1804), by Friedrich Schiller
 Woyzeck (1837), by Georg Büchner

Z 
 Der zerbrochne Krug (1811), by Heinrich von Kleist

See also

 List of German-language playwrights
 
 List of American plays

External links

Lists of plays